The hamburger sign is used in the diagnosis of appendicitis. The sign is used to rule out that disease, with the physician inquiring if the patient would like to consume his/her favourite food. If a patient wants to eat, consider a diagnosis other than appendicitis. Anorexia is 80% sensitive for appendicitis. A positive hamburger sign is demonstrated by a patient declining food.

See also 
 
 Blumberg's sign
 Obturator sign
 Psoas sign
 Rovsing's sign
 McBurney's point

References

Diseases of appendix
Medical signs